Admiral Hogg may refer to:

Ian Hogg (Royal Navy officer) (1911–2003), British Royal Navy vice admiral
James R. Hogg (born 1934), U.S. Navy admiral 
Robin Trower Hogg (born 1932), British Royal Navy rear admiral